Tikhonovka is the name of several rural localities in Russia:
Tikhonovka, Republic of Bashkortostan, a village in Korneyevsky Selsoviet of Meleuzovsky District in the Republic of Bashkortostan; 
Tikhonovka, Republic of Crimea, a selo in Pervomaysky District of the Republic of Crimea
Tikhonovka, Irkutsk Oblast, a selo in Bokhansky District of Irkutsk Oblast
Tikhonovka, Lyudinovsky District, Kaluga Oblast, a village in Lyudinovsky District of Kaluga Oblast
Tikhonovka, Medynsky District, Kaluga Oblast, a village in Medynsky District of Kaluga Oblast
Tikhonovka, Zhizdrinsky District, Kaluga Oblast, a village in Zhizdrinsky District of Kaluga Oblast
Tikhonovka, Burlakovskaya Rural Territory, Prokopyevsky District, Kemerovo Oblast, a settlement in Burlakovskaya Rural Territory of Prokopyevsky District in Kemerovo Oblast; 
Tikhonovka, Terentyevskaya Rural Territory, Prokopyevsky District, Kemerovo Oblast, a settlement in Terentyevskaya Rural Territory of Prokopyevsky District in Kemerovo Oblast; 
Tikhonovka, Kursk Oblast, a village in Rusanovsky Selsoviet of Fatezhsky District in Kursk Oblast
Tikhonovka, Novosibirsk Oblast, a village in Ust-Tarksky District of Novosibirsk Oblast; 
Tikhonovka, Republic of Tatarstan, a selo in Almetyevsky District of the Republic of Tatarstan
Tikhonovka, Aleksinsky District, Tula Oblast, a village in Solopensky Rural Okrug of Aleksinsky District in Tula Oblast
Tikhonovka, Novomoskovsky District, Tula Oblast, a village in Prokhorovsky Rural Okrug of Novomoskovsky District in Tula Oblast
Tikhonovka, Volgograd Oblast, a khutor in Primorsky Selsoviet of Kalachyovsky District in Volgograd Oblast

Notes